Oxford Poetry is a literary magazine based in Oxford, England. It is currently edited by Luke Allan. The magazine is published by Partus Press.

Founded in 1910 by Basil Blackwell, its editors have included Dorothy L. Sayers, Aldous Huxley, Robert Graves, Vera Brittain, Kingsley Amis, Anthony Thwaite, John Fuller and Bernard O'Donoghue.

Among the other authors to have appeared in Oxford Poetry are Fleur Adcock, A. Alvarez, W. H. Auden, Anne Carson, Nevill Coghill, David Constantine, Robert Crawford, Carol Ann Duffy, Elaine Feinstein, Graham Greene, Seamus Heaney, W. N. Herbert, Geoffrey Hill, Christopher Isherwood, Elizabeth Jennings, Jenny Joseph, Stephen Knight, Ronald Knox, Philip Larkin, C. Day-Lewis, Michael Longley, Louis MacNeice, Peter McDonald, Christopher Middleton, Andrew Motion, Paul Muldoon, Tom Paulin, Mario Petrucci, Craig Raine, Jo Shapcott, Stephen Spender, George Szirtes, J. R. R. Tolkien, Susan Wicks and Charles Wright. Traditionally the magazine publishes winners of Oxford's Newdigate Prize.

Editors of Oxford Poetry

Until the Second World War
 1910–13: Gerald H. Crow, Geoffery Dennis, Sherard Vines
 1914: Gerald H. Crow, Sherard Vines
 1915: Gerald H. Crow, T. W. Earp
 1916: Wilfred Rowland Childe, T. W. Earp, Aldous Huxley
 1917: Wilfred Rowland Childe, T. W. Earp, Dorothy L. Sayers
 1918: T. W. Earp, E. F. A. Geach, Dorothy L. Sayers
 1919: T. W. Earp, Dorothy L. Sayers, Siegfried Sassoon
 1920: Vera Brittain, C. H. B. Kitchin, Alan Porter
 1921: Alan Porter, Richard Hughes, Robert Graves
 1922: No editors cited.
 1923: David Cleghorn Thomson, F. W. Bateson
 1924: Harold Acton, Peter Quennell
 1925: Patrick Monkhouse, Charles Plumb
 1926: Charles Plumb, W. H. Auden
 1927: W. H. Auden, C. Day-Lewis
 1928: Clere Parsons, Basil Blackwell
 1929: Louis MacNeice, Stephen Spender
 1930: Stephen Spender, Bernard Spencer
 1931: Bernard Spencer, Richard Goodman
 1932: Richard Goodman
 1933–5: No editions.
 1936: A. W. Sandford, Alan Rook
 1937: Nevill Coghill, Alistair Sandford
 1938–41: No editions.
 1942–3: Ian Davie, John Heath-Stubbs
 1944–5: No editions

Post-War
 1946: Roy Macnab, Gordon Swaine
 1947: Martin Starkie, Roy Macnab
 1948: Arthur Boyars, Barry Harmer
 1949: Kingsley Amis, James Michie
 1950: J. B. Donne, Donald Watt
 1951: J. B. Donne, Martin Seymour-Smith
 1952: Derwent May, James Price
 1953: Donald Hall, Geoffrey Hill
 1954: Jonathan Price, Anthony Thwaite
 1955: Adrian Mitchell, Richard Selig
 1956: Bernard Donoughue, Gabriel Pearson
 1957: Peter Ferguson, Dennis Keene
 1958:. Roger Lonsdale, Judy Spink
 1960:. John Fuller, Francis Hope
 1961–9: No editions.
 1970: Mark Wormald, Robin Leanse

Oxford Poetry re-launched
 June 1983: Mick Imlah, Nicholas Jenkins, Elise Paschen, Nicola Richards
 Autumn 1983: Nicholas Jenkins, Elise Paschen, Nicola Richards
 1984–5: Nicholas Jenkins, Bernard O'Donoghue, Peter McDonald, Elise Paschen
 Winter 1986: Mark Ford, Nicholas Jenkins, John Lanchester, Elise Paschen
 Summer 1987: Mark Ford, Elise Paschen, Mark Wormald
 Winter 1987: Elise Paschen, Mark Wormald
 1988: Mark Wormald, Sarah Dence, Bernard O'Donoghue, Janice Whitten
 1989–91: Mark Wormald
 Summer 1992: Sinéad Garrigan, Kate Reeves, Mark Wormald
 Winter 1992: Sinéad Garrigan, Kate Reeves
 Summer 1993: Sinéad Garrigan, Kate Reeves, Ian Samson
 Winter 1993: Sinéad Garrigan, Ian Samson
 Summer 1994: Sinéad Garrigan, Ian Samson
 Winter 1994. Sinéad Garrigan, Sam Leith
 1995: Sinéad Garrigan, Sam Leith
 1996–7: No editions.
 Easter 1998: Graham Nelson, Gillian Pachter, Robert Macfarlane
 Winter 1998: Graham Nelson, Robert Macfarlane
 1999: Graham Nelson, Jane Griffiths
 2000: Graham Nelson, Jane Griffiths, Jenni Nuttall

21st century
 2003: Carmen Bugan, Kelly Grovier, Sarah Hesketh
 2004: Carmen Bugan, Kelly Grovier, Sinéad Sturgeon
 2006: Carmen Bugan, Kelly Grovier, Richard Rowley, Sinéad Sturgeon
 2007: Paul Thomas Abbott
 2008: Benjamin Mullen, J. C. H. Potts
 2009–2011: Hamid Khanbhai, Thomas A. Richards
 2012–2014: Lavinia Singer, Aime Williams
 2015–2016: Mika Ross-Southall, Lavinia Singer, Andrew Wynn Owen
 2017: Nancy Campbell, Mary Jean Chan, Theophilus Kwek
 2018–2020: Mary Jean Chan, Theophilus Kwek, Jay Bernard, Luke Allan
2021–: Luke Allan

See also 
 The Oxford Magazine

References

External links 
 Oxford Poetry homepage — including online texts
 

Magazines established in 1910
English poetry
Literary magazines published in the United Kingdom
Mass media in Oxford
Poetry magazines published in the United Kingdom
Biannual magazines published in the United Kingdom